Fähnrich zur See (Fähnr zS or FRZS) designates in the German Navy of the Bundeswehr a military person or member of the armed forces with the second highest Officer Aspirant (OA – ) rank. According to the salary class it is equivalent to the Portepeeunteroffizier ranks Bootsmann (Marine) and Feldwebel of Heer or Luftwaffe.

It is also grouped as OR-6 in NATO, equivalent to Technical Sergeant, Staff Sergeant, or Petty Officer First Class in the US Armed forces, and to Petty officer in the British Army and Royal Navy.

In navy context NCOs of this rank were formally addressed as Herr/ Frau Fähnrich zur See also informally / short Fähnrich.

The sequence of ranks (top-down approach) in that particular group is as follows:
Portepeeunteroffiziere
OR-9: Oberstabsbootsmann / Oberstabsfeldwebel
OR-8: Stabsbootsmann / Stabsfeldwebel
OR-7: Oberfähnrich zur See and Hauptbootsmann / Oberfähnrich and Hauptfeldwebel
OR-6a: Oberbootsmann / Oberfeldwebel
OR-6b: Fähnrich zur See and Bootsmann / Fähnrich and Feldwebel

Career and rank insignia

A Fähnrich zur See of the Deutsche Marine is a soldier who serves in the ranks, first as Seekadett (OR-4, comparable to the  junior non-commissioned officer rank Unteroffizier), then in subsequent grades: Fähnrich zur See (OR-6, equivalent to Bootsmann), and Oberfähnrich zur See (OR-7 equivalent to Hauptbootsmann).

In the Deutsche Marine, an officer candidate can be promoted to the rank of Fähnrich zur See after 21 months of service. The equivalent in Heer and Luftwaffe is "Fähnrich".

An officer candidate's career is indicated by the enlisted rank with the golden nautical star on the shoulder strap and sleeve in the Deutsche Marine, and a thin silver cord on the shoulder strap in Heer and Luftwaffe.

Already below the lowest officer designated rank "Seekadett" any military person, assigned to an officer career, has to wear additionally to the particular rank the two capital letters “OA”, indicating to the “Officer Aspirant” career. The "nautical star" symbolizes the "OA" career.

See also
 Ranks of the German Bundeswehr
 Rank insignia of the German Bundeswehr

References

Naval ranks of Germany